Kevin Grant Richardson (born September 12, 1980) is an American former professional baseball catcher. He played in Major League Baseball (MLB) for the Texas Rangers in 2009.

Baseball career
Richardson attended Gonzaga University, where he played college baseball for the Bulldogs from 2001-2002.  Richardson was signed as an undrafted free agent by the Texas Rangers in 2002.  He made his MLB debut against Francisco Liriano and the Minnesota Twins, going 2 for 4.  Richardson appeared in four games for the Rangers in 2009, but was released by the club at the end of the season.

The Los Angeles Angels of Anaheim signed Richardson to a minor league contract with an invite to spring training on January 14, 2011. He played with the AAA Salt Lake Bees.

References

External links

1980 births
Living people
Texas Rangers players
Baseball players from Washington (state)
Major League Baseball catchers
People from Mount Vernon, Washington
Pulaski Rangers players
Clinton LumberKings players
Spokane Indians players
Frisco RoughRiders players
Oklahoma RedHawks players
Oklahoma City RedHawks players
Salt Lake Bees players
Gonzaga Bulldogs baseball players